Strahinja Dragićević (born 28 January 1986) is a retired Serbian professional basketball player.

Personal life
He is a twin brother of Tadija Dragićević who is also a basketball player.

References

External links 
 Profile at euroleague.net
 Profile at eurobasket.com
 Profile at realgm.com

1986 births
Living people
ABA League players
Basketball League of Serbia players
Basketball players from Čačak
KK Mega Basket players
KK Crvena zvezda players
KK Partizan players
KK Pirot players
Serbian men's basketball players
Serbian expatriate basketball people in Bosnia and Herzegovina
Serbian expatriate basketball people in Germany
Serbian expatriate basketball people in Greece
Serbian expatriate basketball people in Cyprus
Tigers Tübingen players
Twin sportspeople
Serbian twins
Power forwards (basketball)